Bhaddar is a village in  Kharian Tehsil, Gujrat District in the Punjab province of Pakistan. It is located at 31° 56' 30N 74° 2' 47E with an altitude of 215 metres (708 feet) and is also chief town of Union Council Bhaddar which is an administrative subdivision of the Tehsil.

History

Bhaddar is an old village. There is evidence that this town was established in the 14th century. Before the independence of Pakistan in 1947, Muslims, Hindus, and Sikhs used to live here in harmony. There are still the ruins of pre-independence buildings here.

Demography 
The population of Bhaddar is estimated to be 5000 plus and belong to the Bhaddar clan of Jatts. The population is 98.21% Muslim majority.

References

Union councils of Gujrat District
Populated places in Gujrat District